The 2021–22 Super League Greece, known as Super League 1 Interwetten for sponsorship reasons, was the 86th season of the Super League Greece, the top Greek professional league for association football clubs, since its establishment in 1959. Olympiacos were the defending champions.

Teams
Fourteen teams will compete in the league – the top twelve teams from the previous season, one team of play-off winner and one team promoted from the Super League 2. The first club to be promoted was Ionikos, after beating Ergotelis 2–1 on 19 May 2021. Ionikos will play in the Super League for the first time since the 2006–07 season. AEL has been relegated to 2021–22 Super League Greece 2, ending their four-year stay in the top flight.

Stadiums and locations

Personnel, kits and TV channel

Managerial changes

Regular season

League table

Results

Play-off round

The top six teams from Regular season will meet twice (10 matches per team) for places in 2022–23 UEFA Champions League and 2022–23 UEFA Europa Conference League as well as deciding the league champion.

Play-off round positions by round

Play-out round

Play-out round positions by round

Relegation play-offs

|+Summary

|}

Season statistics

Top scorers

Top assists

Awards

Best Goal

MVP of the Month

Annual awards
Annual awards were announced on 12 December 2022

Team of the Year

References

External links
Official website 

Greece
1
A1 Ethniki
A1 Ethniki
2021-22